Sturanyella is a genus of land snails with an operculum, terrestrial gastropod mollusks in the family Helicinidae, the helicinids.

The specific name Sturanyella is apparently in honor of Rudolf Sturany (1867-1935), a malacologist from Austria.

Species
Species within the genus Sturanyella include:
 Sturanyella carolinarum
 Sturanyella epicharis
 Sturanyella plicatilis Mouss. - the type species

References 

Helicinidae
Taxonomy articles created by Polbot